Colin Joseph Bibby (20 November 1948 – 7 August 2004) was a British ornithologist and conservationist.

Bibby was born in the Wirral, Cheshire, the son of a North Wales farmer.  He was educated at Oundle School, Northamptonshire, and at St John's College, Cambridge, graduating in natural sciences.  He gained his PhD for a classic study on the ecology and conservation of Dartford warblers.

Bibby was a research staff member for the Royal Society for the Protection of Birds from 1971 to 1986, and the head of Conservation Science from 1986 to 1991. In 1991, he moved to BirdLife International, where he led their research team and a major research program, with projects in over 70 countries. In 2001 he became a self-employed environmental consultant. He was also a member of the Rare Breeding Birds Panel, and the founding editor of the British Trust for Ornithology journal Ringing and Migration.

His major contributions were in the development of quantitative approaches to the study of birds for research leading to conservation. He was also a frequent contributor to British Birds magazine.

In 1994, he was awarded the Dr A.H. Heineken Prize for Environmental Sciences for his work with BirdLife International, and in June 2004, he received the RSPB Medal in recognition of his contribution to ornithology.

He learned that he had an incurable cancer in March 2004 and, on 7 August 2004 at the age of 55, died in his sleep. He was survived by his wife, Ruth, and three sons.

Memorials 

A special supplement published with Bird Conservation International (Vol 18 No 3, September 2008) was dedicated to Bibby. In it, Mike Rands, BirdLife's Chief Executive, wrote:

In 2017 a stained-glass painting of a Dartford Warbler, in the style of Bibby's favourite artist, Eric Ennion, was added to a window at St Michael and All Angels Church, Caldecote, Cambridgeshire in Bibby's honour. Bibby had spent the months after his fatal diagnosis fundraising for the church windows' restoration. A service of dedication for the memorial painting, on 16 July 2017, led by the Archdeacon of Cambridge, Alex Hughes, was attended by over 100 people.

Selected publications
 
  (pbk reprint of 1992 1st edition);

References

External links
BirdLife International obituary

 Bibby, C., M. Jones and S. Marsden (2000) Expedition Field Techniques. Bird Surveys. BirdLife International. Online

1948 births
2004 deaths
British ornithologists
Deaths from cancer in England
People from the Metropolitan Borough of Wirral
Alumni of St John's College, Cambridge
Royal Society for the Protection of Birds people
20th-century British zoologists
People educated at Oundle School